Sant Antoni de Vilamajor is a village in the comarca of Vallès Oriental in the province of Barcelona and autonomous community of Catalonia, Spain.

Local enterprises
Ràdio Vilamajor is a local radio station, broadcasting from the town to the surrounding region.

References

External links
 Government data pages 

Municipalities in Vallès Oriental